Justice Noble may refer to:

Mary C. Noble, deputy chief justice of the Kentucky Supreme Court
Merrill E. Noble, associate justice of the New Mexico Supreme Court

See also
Noble Justice, 2002 album by American rapper Young Noble